Laffin is the surname of:

 Eric Laffin, French curler
 John Laffin (1922–2000), Australian military historian 
 Dominique Laffin (1952–1985), French actress 
 Mike Laffin, Canadian politician
 Christina Laffin, academic, researching Japanese literature and culture 
 Josephine Laffin, Australian theologian